Zacorisca pulchella is a species of moth of the family Tortricidae. It is found in the Philippines on the islands of Luzon and Panai.

The length of the forewings is about 9 mm. There is a dark metallic-blue streak at the base and the apical third of the forewings. The apical part of the hindwings is dark metallic blue.

References

	

Moths described in 1910
Zacorisca
Moths of Asia